Shadows on the Range is a 1946 American Western film directed by Lambert Hillyer and written by Adele Buffington. The film stars Johnny Mack Brown, Raymond Hatton, Jan Bryant, Jack Perrin, John Merton and Marshall Reed. The film was released on October 16, 1946, by Monogram Pictures.

Plot

Cast          
Johnny Mack Brown as Steve Mason / Steve Saunders
Raymond Hatton as Dusty Cripps
Jan Bryant as Ruth Denny
Jack Perrin as Ted
John Merton as Paul Emery
Marshall Reed as Butch Bevans
Steve Clark as Sheriff Skinner
Ted Adams as Bart Brennan
Terry Frost as Bill Cole
Pierce Lyden as Ed 
Cactus Mack as Lefty 
Roy Butler as Sleepy

References

External links
 

1946 films
American Western (genre) films
1946 Western (genre) films
Monogram Pictures films
Films directed by Lambert Hillyer
American black-and-white films
1940s English-language films
1940s American films